FireHawk is an unlicensed game developed by Codemasters (Oliver Twins) which was released by Camerica for the Nintendo Entertainment System. This game has the player being commissioned by the President of the United States to stop the trafficking of drugs into the United States. The player flies an Apache helicopter to different places around the world and the player must destroy the drug traffickers' factories. It is very similar to Desert Strike and the rest of the "Strike" series, and nearly identical to Raid on Bungeling Bay, which was released for the Commodore 64 in 1984 as well as the Nintendo Entertainment System and MSX computers in 1985. On 1993, an unrelated action game Firehawk (Super Nintendo) was shown by Sony.

In 1992 it was released by Codemasters in Europe for the Nintendo Entertainment System (cartridge and Aladdin Deck Enhancer), Atari ST and Amiga.

References

1991 video games
Amiga games
Atari ST games
Camerica games
Codemasters games
Helicopter video games
Nintendo Entertainment System games
Single-player video games
Unauthorized video games
Video games developed in the United Kingdom